Isaac Bishop may refer to:
 Isaac T. Bishop (1844–1920), member of the Wisconsin State Senate
 Isaac W. Bishop (c. 1804–?), American lawyer and politician from New York